Lőrincz is a Hungarian surname. Notable people with the surname include:

Ferenc Lőrincz (ice hockey), Hungarian Olympic hockey player
Tamás Lőrincz (1986) Hungarian wrestler, silver medal at the 2012 Summer Olympics
Márton Lőrincz (1911-1969) Hungarian wrestler and Olympic champion
László L. Lőrincz (1939) Hungarian orientalist and as Leslie L. Lawrence science fiction author
Matthew Lorincz (1968) Canadian scientist
 Dénes Lőrincz and Géza Lőrincz, ethnic Hungarian editors of the Unitárius Hírnök Hungarian Unitarian newspaper in Romania
Allan Levente Lorincz, M.D. (1924-2010), international master of investigative dermatology, teacher, scholar, & chairman of dermatology at the University of Chicago (1961-1991)
Lőrinc Mészáros (1966) Hungarian businessman and oligarch

Hungarian-language surnames